Gaillard is an unincorporated community in Crawford County, in the U.S. state of Georgia.

History
A post office called Gaillard was established in 1903, and remained in operation until 1951. The community was named after a local surveyor.

Decline 
Gaillard was a railroad community that died after the closure of the rail line.

References

Unincorporated communities in Crawford County, Georgia